The Centre City Tower (also spelled Center City Tower) is a  tall skyscraper in Pittsburgh, Pennsylvania. It contains 26 floors, and stands as the 20th-tallest building in the city. Centre City Tower was constructed in 1971, and was later renovated in 2002. The entire building contains Class B office space, and is an example of modern architecture. Signage for Huntington Bank, the building's major tenant, adorns the outside of the structure.

See also
List of tallest buildings in Pittsburgh

References

Emporis
Skyscraperpage

Skyscraper office buildings in Pittsburgh
Office buildings completed in 1971